Abraham Wald ( – ) was a Jewish Hungarian mathematician who contributed to decision theory, geometry, and econometrics and founded the field of statistical sequential analysis. One of his well-known statistical works was written during World War II on how to minimize the damage to bomber aircraft and took into account the survivorship bias in his calculations. He spent his research career at Columbia University.

Life and career 

Wald was born on 31 October 1902 in Kolozsvár, Transylvania, in the Kingdom of Hungary. A religious Jew, he did not attend school on Saturdays, as was then required by the Hungarian school system, and so he was thus homeschooled by his parents until college. His parents were quite knowledgeable and competent as teachers.

In 1928, he graduated in mathematics from the King Ferdinand I University.
In 1927, he entered graduate school at the University of Vienna, from which he graduated in 1931 with a Ph.D. in mathematics. His advisor there was Karl Menger.

Despite Wald's brilliance, he could not obtain a university position because of Austrian discrimination against Jews. However, Oskar Morgenstern created a position for Wald in economics. When Nazi Germany annexed Austria in 1938, the discrimination against Jews intensified. In particular, Wald and his family were persecuted as Jews. Wald immigrated to the United States at the invitation of the Cowles Commission for Research in Economics, to work on econometrics research.

During World War II, Wald was a member of the Statistical Research Group (SRG) at Columbia University, where he applied his statistical skills to various wartime problems. They included methods of sequential analysis and sampling inspection. One of the problems that the SRG worked on was to examine the distribution of damage to aircraft returning after flying missions to provide advice on how to minimize bomber losses to enemy fire. Wald derived a useful means of estimating the damage distribution for all aircraft that flew from the data on the damage distribution of all aircraft that returned. His work is considered seminal in the discipline of operational research, which was then fledgling.

Wald and his wife died in 1950 when the Air India plane (VT-CFK, a DC-3 aircraft) in which they were travelling crashed near the Rangaswamy Pillar in the northern part of the Nilgiri Mountains, in southern India, on an extensive lecture tour at the invitation of the Indian government. He had visited the Indian Statistical Institute at Calcutta and was to attend the Indian Science Congress at Bangalore in January. Their two children were back at home in the United States.

After his death, Wald was criticized by Sir Ronald A. Fisher FRS. Fisher attacked Wald for being a mathematician without scientific experience who had written an incompetent book on statistics. Fisher particularly criticized Wald's work on the design of experiments and alleged ignorance of the basic ideas of the subject, as set out by Fisher and Frank Yates. Wald's work was defended by Jerzy Neyman the next year. Neyman explained Wald's work, particularly with respect to the design of experiments. Lucien Le Cam credits him in his own book, Asymptotic Methods in Statistical Decision Theory: "The ideas and techniques used reflect first and foremost the influence of Abraham Wald's writings."

He was the father of the noted American physicist Robert Wald.

Notable publications 
For a complete list, see

References

Further reading

External links 
 

1902 births
1950 deaths
Scientists from Cluj-Napoca
Austro-Hungarian Jews
Jewish emigrants from Austria to the United States after the Anschluss
Presidents of the Institute of Mathematical Statistics
Fellows of the American Statistical Association
American statisticians
Hungarian statisticians
Econometricians

20th-century American mathematicians
Columbia University faculty
Jewish American scientists
Victims of aviation accidents or incidents in India
20th-century Hungarian mathematicians
Babeș-Bolyai University alumni
University of Vienna alumni
Mathematical economists
Hungarian operations researchers
Functional analysts
American operations researchers
20th-century Hungarian economists
Fellows of the Econometric Society
Mathematical statisticians